Rochelle Independent School District is a public school district based in the community of Rochelle, Texas (USA).  The district has one school, Rochelle School that serves students in grades kindergarten through twelve.

Academic achievement
In 2009, the school district was rated "academically acceptable" by the Texas Education Agency.

Special programs

Athletics
Rochelle High School plays six-man football.

See also

List of school districts in Texas

References

External links
Rochelle ISD

School districts in McCulloch County, Texas